Vitanová is a village and municipality in Tvrdošín District in the Žilina Region of northern Slovakia.

History
In historical records the village was first mentioned in 1550.

Geography
The municipality lies at an altitude of 700 metres and covers an area of 45.798 km2. It has a population of about 1,235 people.

References

External links
http://www.vitanova.obce.info

Villages and municipalities in Tvrdošín District